The list of ship launches in 1820 includes a chronological list of some ships launched in 1820.


References

Sources

1820
Ship launches